Frisby is a Colombian fried chicken restaurant chain founded by Alfredo Hoyos Mazuera in 1977. Frisby was founded in Pereira. It started as a pizzeria; however, later its owners decided to finally go into the fried chicken market, pioneering the fried chicken market in the country, and bringing to Colombia the moniker for the dish, broaster chicken. The owner claims that the company name, Frisby, comes from the technique of spinning pizza dough in the air, which makes it resemble a Frisbee disk  In 1978 they start opening new places in the Coffee axis. In 1987 the first shop in Bogotá is opened, and the same thing happens in Medellín in 1990.  Frisby has more than 200 restaurants in 50 Colombian cities.

Currently, they have added environmentally friendly strategies into their packaging. These are 100% reciclable, with vegetable ink. Additionally they run a campaign to have their beverages without straw.

See also
 List of fast-food chicken restaurants

References

External links
 

Restaurants established in 1977
Fast-food poultry restaurants
Restaurant chains in Colombia